Concrete utopia might refer to:

 Concrete Utopia, a South Korean film
 a name given for Architecture of Yugoslavia
 Concrete utopia movement, a political movement created by Roland Castro